Christian Lopez (born August 1, 1995) is an American singer-songwriter and multi-instrumentalist from Martinsburg, West Virginia. He was also the front man and guitarist of the Christian Lopez Band. Beyond Lopez, band members as of 2017 included Jason Navo on bass, and Cameron McClaren on drums.

Lopez has released two albums and an EP in folk rock and Americana style. Americana Music Show wrote that Lopez's lyrics and delivery have "the earnestness and wide-open view of the world  that we haven't seen since the early days of Paul Simon." The band tours frequently in the United States, and in 2015 Rolling Stone named Lopez "best newcomer" at the Americana Music Festival & Conference, with the article stating that he "packed so much kinetic energy into his set, and sliced so many strings, that he had to finish on a borrowed guitar."

Married actress Skyler Shaye on 10/10/22 in Santa Barbara, CA.

Career

Early life and Pilot EP (1995–2014)

Lopez was born in Martinsburg, West Virginia, where he was also raised. He started playing music at an early age, learning the piano at age 5 and guitar at age 9. He began songwriting in his early teenage years, and was touring before the age of 16.

In 2011 he made it to Hollywood on Season 11 of American Idol, but due to the flu he didn't make it past the group cuts. He auditioned again and made it to Hollywood week again on Season 12 of American Idol. After he was eliminated from American Idol, he performed local shows with his band Christian Lopez & Joe Taxi.

In 2013, he signed a management agreement with Rock Ridge Music, and in early 2014 the Christian Lopez Band signed a record deal with Blaster Records. Shortly thereafter, he recorded his first release, the five song EP Pilot, which was released in October 2014.[9] Dave Cobb produced the release.[10]

In 2014, the band was selected as one of the winners of the Belk Modern Musician Showcase talent search and invited to join Belk's 2014 "Modern Southern Music" tour. They performed at numerous concerts including shows by Zac Brown Band, Dave Matthews Band, on the Vans Warped Tour, Miranda Lambert, The Black Lillies, Brothers Osborne, and Marty Stuart.

Onward and touring (2015)
In May 2015, Lopez released his first full-length album Onward. Like his previous EP, it was produced by Dave Cobb (Sturgill Simpson, Jason Isbell, Chris Stapleton). Popmatters streamed the album on May 12, 2015.

From Onward, the track "Will I See You Again" received over 1 million Spotify streams, and the song "Leaving It Out" remained in the CMT Pure Country "12 Pack Countdown" for a number of consecutive weeks. Rolling Stone called the album "a plucky and occasionally subdued showcase of his Appalachia roots."

In 2015, Lopez participated in West Virginia's "Real" tourism campaign and was featured in a promotional video entitled "Real WV." "Will I See You Again" was used in a second spot entitled "Real Morgantown." Additionally, he has been invited to perform at 2015's Music Hall Of Fame Induction ceremony as well as the band's inaugural appearance at Mountain Stage.

Red Arrow (2017)
On September 22, 2017, Lopez released his second album entitled, Red Arrow, this time using producer Marshall Altman, known for his work with Marc Broussard and Frankie Ballard. Guests include Vince Gill's guitar on "Still on Its Feet," and The Milk Carton Kids Kenneth Pattengale's guitar and vocals on "Caramel." 
Rolling Stone said that Red Arrow "flies straight through multiple eras of rock, pop and country. Organic sounds are favored over electronics, while Lopez's versatile guitar playing provides a millennial take on everything from Eighties rock to timeless folk. Sly, generation-bridging vocals are the common thread, and as interest in Americana rises, Lopez could connect the dots for many young listeners."

The music magazine also earlier named Lopez "One of the 10 New Country Artists You Need To Know".

Among the 2017 tour dates, and just before the release of Red Arrow in September 2017, Lopez joined 300 acts on the bill of Americana Fest in Nashville.

The Other Side (2021) 
In 2021, he released his third album, The Other Side, produced by Robert Adam Stevenson, with 12 tracks.  Singles from the album include, “Sip Of Mine”.

Band lineups

Christian Lopez Band
 Christian Lopez – guitar, vocals
 Chelsea McBee – banjo, vocals
 Mark Shottinger – bass
 Pete Teselsky – drums
 Ricky Wise – drums

Christian Lopez
 Christian Lopez – guitar, vocals
 Jason Navo – bass
 Cameron McClaren – drums

Discography

References

External links 
 
 
 
 

1995 births
Musicians from West Virginia
American male singer-songwriters
Living people
21st-century American singers
21st-century American male singers
Americana musicians
People from Martinsburg, West Virginia
Singer-songwriters from West Virginia